Italian irredentism in Dalmatia was the political movement supporting the unification to Italy, during the 19th and 20th centuries, of Adriatic Dalmatia.

History

19th century
The Republic of Venice, between the 9th century and 1797, extended its dominion to Istria, the islands of Kvarner and Dalmatia, when it was conquered by Napoleon. After the fall of Napoleon (1814) Istria, the islands of Kvarner and Dalmatia were annexed to the Austrian Empire. Many Istrian Italians and Dalmatian Italians looked with sympathy towards the Risorgimento movement that fought for the unification of Italy. The first events that involved the Dalmatian Italians in the unification of Italy were the revolutions of 1848, during which they took part in the constitution of the Republic of San Marco in Venice. The most notable Dalmatian Italians exponents who intervened were Niccolò Tommaseo and Federico Seismit-Doda. 

After the Third Italian War of Independence (1866), when the Veneto and Friuli regions were ceded by the Austrians to the newly formed Kingdom Italy, Istria and Dalmatia remained part of the Austro-Hungarian Empire, together with other Italian-speaking areas on the eastern Adriatic. This triggered the gradual rise of Italian irredentism among many Italians in Istria, Kvarner and Dalmatia, who demanded the unification of the Julian March, Kvarner and Dalmatia with Italy. The Italians in Istria, Kvarner and Dalmatia supported the Italian Risorgimento; as a consequence, the Austrians saw the Italians as enemies and favored the Slav communities of Istria, Kvarner and Dalmatia, fostering the nascent nationalism of Slovenes and Croats. During the meeting of the Council of Ministers on 12 November 1866, Emperor Franz Joseph I of Austria outlined a wide-ranging project aimed at the Germanization or Slavization of the areas of the empire with an Italian presence:

The Italian linguist Matteo Bartoli calculated that Italian was the primary spoken language by 33% of the Dalmatian population in 1803. Bartoli's evaluation was followed by other claims that Auguste de Marmont, the French Governor General of the Napoleonic Illyrian Provinces commissioned a census in 1809 which found that Dalmatian Italians comprised 29% of the total population of Dalmatia. 

With the development of Croatian nationalism, critics such as Croatian historian Duško Večerina alleged that these evaluations were not conducted by modern scientific standards and that they took spoken language as the criterion, rather than blood, origin and ethnicity. They pointed out that according to a report by Imperial court councillor Joseph Fölch in 1827, the Italian language was spoken by noblemen and some citizens of middle and lower classes exclusively in the coastal cities of Zadar, Šibenik and Split. Since only around 20,000 people populated these towns and not all were Italian speakers, they claim that the real number was rather smaller, probably around seven percent of the total population, as is asserted by the Department of Historical Studies of the Croatian Academy of Sciences and Arts (HAZU).

Not only Italian irredentists (like Gabriele D'Annunzio), but also Italian prominent scholars (like Angelo Vivante), alleged that Joseph Fölch did not include the Dalmatian islands of Cres (Cherso), Lošinj (Lussino), Krk (Veglia), Vis (Lissa), Hvar (Lesina), Korcula (Curzola) and many other islands with significant Italian communities. They reasserted that the only official evidence about the Dalmatian population comes from the 1857 Austro-Hungarian census, which showed that in this year there were 369,310 indigenous Croatians and 45,000 Italians in Dalmatia, making Dalmatian Italians 10.8 percent of the total population of Dalmatia in the mid-19th century.

Two nationalist movements were born in Dalmatia, the Italian and the Slav. The political instances of the Dalmatian Italians were promoted to the Autonomist Party, founded in 1878 and dissolved in 1915: a prominent member was Antonio Bajamonti, who from 1860 to 1880 was mayor of Split. The party, which originally also had the favour of part of the Slavic population, gradually replaced an autonomous program for the region with an irredentist project for the region, given the hostility of the Austrian authorities and the disagreements with the Slavic element.

In 1889, the foundation of the Dante Alighieri Society, with the aim of protecting and promoting the Italian language, made it possible to give support to the initiatives for the preservation of the Italian-speaking linguistic element. In this period Roberto Ghiglianovich, as trustee of the company establishes the La Lega in Zadar and promoted the enhancement of Italian culture in the area. The same year the irredentist Luigi Ziliotto becomes mayor of Zara, a position he would hold until the outbreak of World War I, was accused of treason and declared forfeited by the Austrian authorities. The policy of collaboration with the local Serbs, inaugurated by Roberto Ghiglianovich and by Giovanni Avoscani, then allowed the Italians to conquer the municipal administration of Dubrovnik in 1899.

20th century

In 1909, the Italian language lost its status as the official language of Dalmatia in favour of Croatian only (previously both languages were recognized), thus Italian could no longer be used in the public and administrative sphere.

For the Austrian Kingdom of Dalmatia, (Dalmatia), the 1910 numbers were 96.2 percent Slavic speakers and 2.8 percent Italian speakers, recording a drastic decline in the number of Dalmatian Italians, who in 1845 amounted to 20 percent of the total population of Dalmatia. Another evidence about the Dalmatian population comes from the 1857 Austro-Hungarian census, which showed that in this year there were 369,310 indigenous Croatians and 45,000 Italians in Dalmatia, making Dalmatian Italians 10.8 percent of the total population of Dalmatia in the mid-19th century.

Dalmatia was a strategic region during World War I that both Italy and Serbia intended to seize from Austria-Hungary. Italy joined the Triple Entente Allies in 1915 upon agreeing to the London Pact that guaranteed Italy the right to annex a large portion of Dalmatia in exchange for Italy's participation on the Allied side. From  5–6 November 1918, Italian forces were reported to have reached Vis, Lastovo, Šibenik, and other localities on the Dalmatian coast. By the end of the hostilities in November 1918, the Italian military had seized control of the entire portion of Dalmatia that had been guaranteed to Italy by the London Pact and by 17 November had seized Fiume as well. In 1918, Admiral Enrico Millo declared himself Italy's Governor of Dalmatia. Italian nationalist Gabriele d'Annunzio supported the seizure of Dalmatia, and proceeded to occupy some areas in an Italian warship in December 1918.

The last city with a significant Italian presence in Dalmatia was the city of Zara (now called Zadar). In the Austro-Hungarian census of 1910, the city of Zara had an Italian population of 9,318 out of 13,438 inhabitants (69.3 percent). In 1921, the population grew to 17,075 inhabitants, of which 12,075 Italians (70.8 percent). In 1941, during World War II, Yugoslavia was occupied by Italy and Germany. Dalmatia was divided between Italy, which constituted the Governorate of Dalmatia, and the Independent State of Croatia, which annexed Dubrovnik and Morlachia. After the Italian surrender on 8 September 1943, the Independent State of Croatia annexed the Governorate of Dalmatia, except for the territories that had been Italian before the start of the conflict, such as Zara.

In 1943, Josip Broz Tito informed the Allies that Zara was a chief logistic centre for German forces in Yugoslavia. By overstating its importance, he persuaded them of its military significance. Italy surrendered in September 1943 and over the following year, specifically between 2 November 1943 and 31 October 1944, Allied Forces bombarded the town 54 times. Nearly 2,000 people were buried beneath rubble; 10–12,000 people escaped and took refuge in Trieste and just over 1,000 people reached Apulia. Tito's partisans entered the city on 31 October 1944, and 138 people were killed. With the Peace Treaty of 1947, Italians still living in the city and in Dalmatia followed the Italian exodus from Istria and Dalmatia and only about 100 Dalmatian Italians now remain in Zadar.

See also
Italian irredentism in Istria
Governorate of Dalmatia

Notes

Bibliography
Bartoli, Matteo. Le parlate italiane della Venezia Giulia e della Dalmazia. Tipografia italo-orientale. Grottaferrata, 1919.
Barzilai, Salvatose. L'irredentismo: ecco il nemico! Editore Il Circolo Garibaldi, 1890. Harvard University, 2002
Lovrovici, Giovanni Eleuterio. Zara dai bombardamenti all'esodo (1943–1947). Tipografia Santa Lucia - Marino. Roma, 1974.
Monzali, Vitale. The Italians of Dalmatia: from Italian unification to World War I. University of Toronto Press. Toronto, 2009. 
Petacco, Arrigo. A tragedy revealed: the story of Italians from Istria, Dalmatia, Venezia Giulia (1943–1953). University of Toronto Press. Toronto, 1998
Rodogno, Davide. Fascism's European empire: Italian occupation during the Second World War. Publisher Cambridge University Press. Cambridge, 2006 
Tommaseo, Niccolo. La questione dalmatica riguardata ne'suoi nuovi aspetti: osservazioni. (Tipografia Fratelli Battara, 1861). Harvard University Press. Harvard, 2007
Večerina, Duško. Talijanski Iredentizam. Zagreb, 2001. 
Vignoli, Giulio. I territori italofoni non appartenenti alla Repubblica Italiana. Giuffrè Editoriale. Milano, 1995.
Vivante, Angelo. Irredentismo adriatico. Venezia, 1984.

Italian irredentism
Dalmatia
Political controversies in Italy
Adriatic question